The 2022 PDC Pro Tour is the next series of non-televised darts tournaments organised by the Professional Darts Corporation (PDC). Players Championships and European Tour events are the events that make up the Pro Tour. There will be thirty Players Championship events and thirteen PDC European Tour events, and after the split format last year, the Challenge and Development Tours will return as one big tour, rather than a UK/European split tour.

Prize money
The prize money for the Players Championship events rose from 2021 levels, with each event having a prize fund of £100,000.

This is how the prize money is divided:

PDC Tour Card
128 players are granted Tour Cards, which enables them to participate in all Players Championships events, the UK Open and qualifiers for all European Tour and select televised events.

Tour cards

The 2022 Tour Cards are awarded to:
 (64) The top 64 players from the PDC Order of Merit after the 2022 World Championship. 
 (24) 24 qualifiers from 2021 Q-School not ranked in the top 64 of the PDC Order of Merit following the World Championship.
 and  resigned their Tour Cards after one year.
 (2) Two highest qualifiers from 2020 Challenge Tour ( and ).
 (2) Two highest qualifiers from 2020 Development Tour ( and ).
 (1) The winner of the 2021 UK Challenge Tour.
 (1) The winner of the 2021 European Challenge Tour.
 (1) The winner of the 2021 UK Development Tour.
 (1) The winner of the 2021 European Development Tour.
 (8) The daily winners from the 2022 Qualifying Schools.

Afterwards, the playing field will be complemented by the highest qualified players from the Q-School Order of Merit until the maximum number of 128 Pro Tour Card players has been reached. In 2022, that means that a total of 24 additional players will qualify this way.

Q-School
The PDC Pro Tour Qualifying School (or Q-School) was split into a UK and European Q-School. Players that are not from Europe can choose which Q-School they want to compete in.

Q-School will once again be split into two stages; with all players who lost their tour cards after the 2022 World Championship and the players who finished from second to fourth in the 2021 Challenge Tour and Development Tour Orders of Merit exempted to the final stage. The first stage consisted a block of three days, with the last eight players on each day qualifying into the final stage. A ranking of other players will also be produced with players qualifying via that ranking to produce a full list of 128 players for each final stage.

Stage One took place between 9–11 January; with the Final Stage held between 12 and 15 January. The winner of each day's play in the Final Stage were given a PDC Tour Card.

The UK Q-School was held at the Alexandra Palace, London England , England; with the European Q-School held at the H+ Hotel, Niedernhausen, Germany.

An Order of Merit was created for each Q School. For every win after the Last 64, the players will be awarded 1 point.

To complete the field of 128 Tour Card Holders, places were allocated down the final Q-School Order of Merits in proportion to the number of participants, with 13 cards going to the UK Q-School and 11 going to the European Q-School.

The following players picked up Tour Cards as a result:

UK Q-School Order of Merit
 
 
 
 
 
 
 
 
 
 
 
 
 

European Q-School Order of Merit

Players Championships
Following the Super Series events in the last 18 months, the Players Championship events returned to normal in 2022 with 30 events taking place.

European Tour
The PDC European Tour returned to the pre-pandemic level of 13 events, having been reduced to four events in 2020, and just two in 2021. On 9 February 2022, the Belgian Darts Open, originally scheduled for 25–27 March was rescheduled to 23–25 September, owing to COVID-19 restrictions in Belgium.

PDC Challenge Tour
Following the split into UK and European Challenge Tours in 2021, the Challenge Tour became one again in 2022, with 4 weekends of 5 events, and 1 weekend of 4 events. The top 2 players on the Order of Merit earned a PDC Tour Card and a place at the 2023 PDC World Darts Championship, while the winner of the Order of Merit earned a spot at the 2022 Grand Slam of Darts as well.

PDC Development Tour
Following the split into UK and European Development Tours in 2021, the Development Tour became one again in 2022, with 4 weekends of 5 events, and 1 weekend of 4 events. The top 2 players on the Order of Merit get a PDC Tour Card and a place at the 2023 PDC World Darts Championship, meanwhile the winner of the Order of Merit gets a spot at the 2022 Grand Slam of Darts as well.

PDC Women's Series
The PDC Women's Series was expanded to 20 events held over five weekends.

The top two ranked players qualify for the 2023 PDC World Darts Championship, meanwhile the Order of Merit leader after all events qualifies for the 2022 Grand Slam of Darts as well. The top eight ranked players (after 12 events) qualified for the first edition of the Women's World Matchplay in 2022.

Professional Darts Corporation Nordic & Baltic (PDCNB) Tour
On 26 November 2021, the PDCNB unveiled their 2022 calendar, which is set to include 5 weekends, incorporating 2 weekends in Denmark, and one weekend each in Sweden, Finland and Latvia, although the Sweden weekend will be purely held for European Tour qualifiers. The top two players on the Order of merit qualify for the 2023 PDC World Darts Championship.

Dartplayers Australia (DPA) Pro Tour
The Dartplayers Australia Tour was modified once again to reduce the amount of travel required within the context of the global pandemic. The original format was that every event would consist of five state round robin rounds. After which an online 32 player knockout round would be played. After the first event there were technical difficulties with the online knockout round. It was then decided that every state event would be played out with separate knockout stages. With the top 16 from every state after all 15 events qualifying for the Australasian Championships.

Online Knockout Event

New South Wales

Queensland

Western Australia

South Australia
Notably in the South Australian events, Kym Mitchell became the first female winner of a DPA event in the 20-year history of the organisation.

Victoria

DPA ProTour Playoff
On 17 July, the DPA hosted the ProTour Playoff.The tournament was won by Raymond Smith, who qualified for the 2023 PDC World Darts Championship.

DPA Oceanic Masters
On 23 October, the DPA hosted the Oceanic Masters.The tournament was won by Mal Cuming, who qualified for the 2023 PDC World Darts Championship.

Dartplayers New Zealand (DPNZ) Pro Tour
The Dartplayers New Zealand Tour consisted of 8 events in 2022. They were held over 4 weekends.

EuroAsian Darts Corporation (EADC) Pro Tour
The EuroAsian Darts Corporation was due to host 6 events over 2 weekends, however the second weekend was cancelled due to the 2022 Russian invasion of Ukraine, and the EADC was suspended from hosting any darting events until further notice.

Championship Darts Corporation (CDC) Pro Tour
The Championship Darts Corporation returned as one combined tour in 2022, after having split US and Canadian events in 2021. It hosted 12 events held over 4 weekends.

Continental Cup
The CDC Continental Cup was held on 22 October. The winner of the Continental Cup will earn entry into the 2023 US Darts Masters.

World Championship International Qualifiers
Amongst the World Championship qualifiers for the 2023 PDC World Darts Championship saw the guarantee of the first ever representative from Ukraine, following the suspension of the Eurasian Darts Corporation (EADC), due to the as-still ongoing Russian invasion of Ukraine.

References

 
PDC Pro Tour
2022 in darts